The 1903 Wyoming Cowboys football team represented the University of Wyoming as an independent during the 1903 college football season. In its fourth season under head coach William McMurray, the team compiled a 3–2 record and was outscored by a total of 63 to 32. Julius Merz was the team captain.

Schedule

References

Wyoming
Wyoming Cowboys football seasons
Wyoming Cowboys football